Shane Warne, a late Australian international cricketer, had taken 37 five-wicket hauls during his career playing for the Australia national cricket team. In cricket, a five-wicket haul – also known as a five-for or fifer – refers to a bowler taking five or more wickets in a single innings. This is regarded as a notable achievement, and only five bowlers have taken more than 30 five-wicket hauls in their Test cricket careers. Warne has the second most five-wicket hauls in Test cricket, behind Sri Lanka's Muttiah Muralitharan. Despite this, he has only taken a single five-wicket haul in One Day Internationals (ODI). He is one of the most experienced Australian cricketers, and the second leading wicket taker in Test cricket history, with 708 wickets, again behind Muralitharan. He is twelfth on the all-time list of ODI wicket takers. In 2000, Warne was named the fourth of five Wisden Cricketers of the Century, behind Don Bradman, Garfield Sobers and Jack Hobbs.

Warne made his Test debut against the Indian team at the Sydney Cricket Ground (SCG) in January 1992, and took his first five-wicket haul later that year, against the West Indies team at the Melbourne Cricket Ground. He has taken ten or more wickets in a match 10 times in his career, and is second in the all-time list behind Muralitharan, with 22. Warne's career-best bowling figures in an innings is 8 wickets for 71 runs, which he accomplished in 1994 against the English team at the Brisbane Cricket Ground, while his best match figures are 12 wickets for 128 runs, achieved in 1994 against the South Africa team in Sydney. Warne has been most successful against England, taking 11 five-wicket hauls against them, the first in 1993 and the last in 2006, and was most prolific at the SCG, where 5 of his 38 five-wicket hauls were taken. Warne retired from international cricket in January 2007, having taken 708 Test and 293 ODI wickets in his career. He announced his retirement from all forms of cricket in May 2011.

Key

Tests

One Day Internationals

References
Specific

General

External links
Player profile of Shane Warne at ESPNcricinfo

Shane Warne
Warne, Shane
Warne,5-wicket